There are many different types of software available to produce charts.

A number of notable examples (with their own Wikipedia articles) are given below and organized according to the programming language or other context in which they are used.

Delphi - VCL and FireMonkey (FMX) 
 TeeChart - Native VCL Charting component with support to Embarcadero Windows IDEs (RAD Studio, Delphi and C++ Builder) and FireMonkey. Commercial license

Java 
 JFreeChart – Free Java based chart software
 TeeChart – Java charting library. Commercial license

JavaScript 

 AnyChart - HTML5/SVG/VML, free or commercial
 Chart.js - HTML5 Canvas, MIT license
 D3.js – HTML5/CSS3/SVG, BSD license
 Datacopia – JavaScript/HTML5, SVG/Canvas - Free or Commercial
 ExtJS 4 Charts – HTML5/SVG/Canvas, GPL or Commercial license
 FusionCharts - JavaScript/HTML5. Commercial license
 Google Charts - HTML5/SVG/VML, free
 jqxChart - SVG/VML/HTML5 chart. Free and commercial licences
 JS InfoVis Toolkit – HTML5/SVG, MIT license
 Plotly.js - MIT license
 RGraph - HTML5/SVG/Canvas, MIT license
 TeeChart – Cross-browser HTML5 Canvas, Open Source license
 Webix UI - JavaScript/HTML5, Free or Commercial license

.NET 
 TeeChart - Native C#.NET Charting Control (ASP.NET/MVC/WPF/Silverlight/Windows Forms/WebForms/Universal Windows Platform (UWP)/Xamarin/iOS/Android) Commercial license
 Visifire – Single API for desktop, web and mobile. (Windows 8/WPF/Silverlight/Windows Phone)

Pascal and ObjectPascal 
 TeeChart – For Delphi. Commercial version. Bundled with Delphi IDE
 TAChart - Charting component for the Lazarus IDE

PHP 
 TeeChart – For all PHP development environments including Delphi for PHP. Free Open Source and Commercial versions

Python 
 Matplotlib - PSF license
 Plotly - MIT license

R 
 R: Extensive support for publication-quality charting in both the base system and contributed packages.

S 
 S-Plus: Built-in charting commands, extended by external packages

Spreadsheets 
 EditGrid – web-based spreadsheet with charting capabilities
 Google Sheets – Online spreadsheet with built-in charting function for basic chart types
 KChart – the charting tool of the Calligra Suite
 LibreOffice Calc - Built-in charting function for basic chart types
 Microsoft Excel – Built-in charting function for basic chart types
 Apache OpenOffice Calc - Built-in charting function for basic chart types
 Numbers – iWork spreadsheet application with charting capabilities
 Webix UI - JavaScript/HTML5, Commercial license

See also 
 Comparison of JavaScript charting frameworks
 List of information graphics software

Charts
Lists of software
Plotting software